was a Japanese film director and screenwriter.

Selected filmography
 1932 Dōinrei, Mobilization Orders (lost)
 1936 Takuboku, Poet of Passion
 1936 Many People
 1938 The Abe Clan

References

External links

1904 births
1986 deaths
Japanese film directors
Samurai film directors